Strawberry Hill House—often called simply Strawberry Hill—is a Gothic Revival villa that was built in Twickenham, London, by Horace Walpole (1717–1797) from 1749 onward. It is a typical example of the "Strawberry Hill Gothic" style of architecture, and it prefigured the nineteenth-century Gothic Revival.

Walpole rebuilt the existing house in stages starting in 1749, 1760, 1772 and 1776. These added Gothic features such as towers and battlements outside and elaborate decoration inside to create "gloomth" to suit Walpole's collection of antiquarian objects, contrasting with the more cheerful or "riant" garden. The interior included a Robert Adam fireplace; parts of the exterior were designed by James Essex. The garden contained a large seat shaped like a Rococo sea shell, which was recreated in the 2012 restoration of the garden, one of the many examples of historic garden conservation in the UK.

Under Horace Walpole

Purchase and planning 

Horace was under familial and political pressure to establish a country seat, especially a family castle, which was a fashionable practice during the period. The following year he purchased the house which the original owner, a coachman, had named "Chopped Straw Hall". This was intolerable to Walpole, "his residence ought, he thought, to possess some distinctive appellation; of a very different character..." Finding an old lease that described his land as "Strawberry Hill Shot", Walpole adopted this new name for his soon to be "elegant villa".

As Rosemary Hill notes, "Strawberry Hill was the first house without any existing medieval fabric to be [re]built from scratch in the Gothic style and the first to be based on actual historic examples, rather than an extrapolation of the Gothic vocabulary first developed by William Kent. As such it has a claim to be the starting point of the Gothic Revival."

Walpole and two friends, including the connoisseur and amateur architect, John Chute (1701–1776), and draughtsman and designer, Richard Bentley (1708–1782), called themselves a "Committee of Taste" or "Strawberry Committee" which would modify the architecture of the building. Bentley left the group abruptly after an argument in 1761. Chute had an "eclectic but rather dry style" and was in charge of designing most of the exterior of the house and some of the interior. To Walpole, he was an "oracle of taste". Walpole often disagreed with Bentley on some of his wayward schemes, but admired his talent for illustration.

Construction 

William Robinson of the Royal Office of Works contributed professional experience in overseeing construction. They looked at many examples of architecture in England and in other countries, adapting such works as the chapel at Westminster Abbey built by Henry VII for inspiration for the fan vaulting of the gallery, without any pretence at scholarship. Chimney-pieces were improvised from engravings of tombs at Westminster and Canterbury and Gothic stone fretwork blind details were reproduced by painted wallpapers, while in the Round Tower added in 1771, the chimney-piece was based on the tomb of Edward the Confessor "improved by Mr. Adam".

He incorporated many of the exterior details of cathedrals into the interior of the house. Externally there seemed to be two predominant styles 'mixed'; a style based on castles with turrets and battlements, and a style based on Gothic cathedrals with arched windows and stained glass.

The building evolved similarly to how a medieval cathedral often evolved over time, with no fixed plan from the beginning. Indeed, Michael Snodin argues, "the most striking external feature of Strawberry Hill was its irregular plan and broken picturesque silhouette". Walpole added new features over a thirty-year period, as he saw fit.

The first stage to make, in Walpole's words, a 'little Gothic castle' began in 1749 and was complete by 1753, a second stage began in 1760, and there were other modifications such as work on the great north bedchamber in 1772, and the "Beauclerk Tower" of the third phase of alterations, completed to designs of a professional architect, James Essex, in 1776. The total cost came to about £20,720.

Walpole's 'little Gothic castle' has significance as one of the most influential individual buildings of such Rococo "Gothick" architecture which prefigured the later developments of the nineteenth century Gothic revival, and for increasing the use of Gothic designs for houses. This style has variously been described as Georgian Gothic, Strawberry Hill Gothic, or Georgian Rococo.

Interior and collection 

Walpole's eccentric and unique style on the inside rooms of Strawberry Hill complemented the Gothic exterior. The house is described by Walpole as "the scene that inspired, the author of The Castle of Otranto", though Michael Snodin has observed: "it is an interesting comment on 18th-century sensibility that the melancholy interiors of The Castle of Otranto were suggested by the light, elegant, even whimsical rooms at Strawberry Hill".

The interiors of Walpole's "little play-thing house" were intended to be "settings of Gothic 'gloomth' for Walpole's collection". His collection of curious, singular, antiquarian objects was well publicized; Walpole himself published two editions of A Description of the Villa of Mr. Horace Walpole at Strawberry Hill to make the "world aware of the extent of his collection".

Speaking on Walpole's collection, Clive Wainwright states that Walpole's collection "constituted an essential part of the interiors of his house". The character of the rooms at Strawberry Hill was "created and dictated" by Walpole's taste for antiquarianism. Though even without the collection present, the house "retains a fairy-tale quality".

Horace Walpole's Strawberry Hill Collection of several thousand items can still be viewed today. The Lewis Walpole Library of Yale University now has a database which "encompasses the entire range of art and artifacts from Walpole's collections, including all items whose location is currently known and those as yet untraced but known through a variety of historical records".

Gardens 

Walpole was as meticulous in designing and developing his gardens as he was improving his house, though "his ignorance of horticulture at first embarrassed him a little". Improvements on the grounds were started even before work on the house. 
In an essay titled "On Modern Gardening", Walpole expresses his own ideas as reflected in his Strawberry Hill grounds. Walpole's taste in landscape and gardening moved away from the traditional, formal layout of "parterre, terraces, marble urns, statued fountains and ‘canals measured by the line'". The French or Italian taste seemed, to Walpole, alien to the English climate "resulting in symmetrical and unnatural gardens". Trees and shrubs were planted in "natural groupings" on the lawn. Walpole preferred to see all nature as a garden. He did not however appreciate the extravagant "romantic grotto and that favorite eighteenth-century conceit, the hermitage".

From "On Modern Gardening": "the fairest scenes, that depend on themselves alone, weary when often seen. The Doric portico, the Palladian bridge, the Gothic ruin, the Chinese pagoda, that surprise the stranger, soon lose their charms to their surfeited master. But the ornament whose merit soonest fades, is the hermitage, or scene adapted to contemplation. It is almost comic to set aside a quarter of one's garden to be melancholy in." Here, Walpole's separation of style between his house and grounds can be seen. A friend, Horace Mann, assumed that Walpole's garden would be similarly Gothic. Walpole responded; "Gothic is merely architecture, and as one has a satisfaction in imprinting the gloomth of abbeys and cathedrals on one's house, so one's garden, on the contrary, is to be nothing but riant, and the gaiety of nature".

Walpole saw the modern English garden as a point of perfection: "we have given the true model of gardening to the world; let other countries mimic or corrupt our taste; but let it reign here on its verdant throne, original by its elegant simplicity, and proud of no other art than that of softening nature's harshness and copying her graceful touch". He was a follower of William Kent, one of the originators of the English landscape garden.

The gardens are Grade II* listed on the Register of Historic Parks and Gardens.

Shell bench 

One particular attraction of Walpole's gardens was a Rococo garden seat carved to resemble a large sea shell. "This shell was one of Mr. Walpole's favourite inventions – for Strawberry Hill was crammed with inventions and contrivances. It was a seat in the form of a huge bivalve of a species not easily recognized, which generally elicited a vast amount of wonder and admiration from his visitors". This bench, a rustic cottage, and a chapel in the woods show Walpole's charmingly eccentric taste.

The seat was originally placed at the corner of Walpole's estate, where Walpole and his visitors could view the river and the landscape beyond. Although only two drawings of the original bench survive, "the garden is as far as possible being restored to its original appearance. Walpole's extraordinary Shell Bench has been recreated" according to the Strawberry Hill website.

Visitors 
Even in Walpole's lifetime, Strawberry Hill drew many visitors to admire the architecture, grounds, and Walpole's carefully cultivated collection. According to Elliot Warburton, "Strawberry Hill in its new form soon became the marvel of the neighbourhood – a little later became the town talk – in a short time a theme of frequent comment even in distant parts of the country". "The highest personages of the realm" including the royal family came to visit Strawberry Hill, as well as more common sightseers. These visitors became an incessant addition to Strawberry Hill, and as delighted as Walpole was to share his vision, they became a bit of a nuisance to him. 
While Walpole gave tours to the more important visitors, he shrank from less dignified attention and "retreated to his cottage in the flower garden" while his housekeeper gave tours to the public.

In a letter to George Montagu in 1763, Walpole complained: "I have but a minute's time in answering your letter, my house is full of people, and has been so from the instant I breakfasted, and more are coming- in short, I keep an inn; the sign, the Gothic Castle...my whole time is passed in giving tickets for seeing it, and hiding myself when it is seen- take my advice, never build a charming house for yourself between London and Hampton-court, everybody will live in it but you." Warburton notes that while Walpole may have been annoyed from time to time, he also came to see his estate contributing to the public's enjoyment when he had doubts about his endeavour. "He arrives at the conclusion that all he has done is for the benefit of others rather than for himself".

Chronology 

A list of important dates in Horace Walpole's life surrounding Strawberry Hill:
 1739 – Sets off with Thomas Gray on the Grand Tour; visits France and Italy; meets John Chute in Florence
 1745 – Father dies, leaving Horace his fortune and a house on Arlington Street
 1747 – Finds and leases Strawberry Hill
 1749 – Purchases Strawberry Hill
 1750 – Forms the "Committee on Taste" with John Chute and Richard Bentley to start planning the Gothic development of Strawberry Hill
 1753 - Building completed (first stage)
 1757 – Sets up Strawberry Hill Press
 1764 – The Castle of Otranto is published
 1774 – Prints A Description of the Villa of Mr. Horace Walpole
 1784 – Prints A Description of the Villa of Mr. Horace Walpole with new additions and illustrations

Later owners

After Walpole's death, the house passed first to his cousin Anne Seymour Damer, then in 1797 to John Waldegrave, a grandson of Maria Walpole, the illegitimate daughter of Walpole's older brother Edward. In the first half of the 19th century, two successive owners, brothers John and George Waldegrave, spent most of the family fortune, culminating in a "Great Sale" lasting twenty-four days held in the grounds in 1842 which left the house stripped of virtually all its contents. From 1883 to 1887 the property was owned by Baron Hermann de Stern (1815–1887), a German-born British banker. In 1923, it was bought by the Roman Catholic St Mary's University College, renamed St Mary's University, Twickenham in 2014.

21st century 
In 2004, Strawberry Hill featured in the TV series Restoration. In 2007, it was leased to the Strawberry Hill Trust for restoration and eventual opening to the public.

The collection at Horace Walpole's Strawberry Hill was featured at the Victoria & Albert Museum from March to July 2010 to prepare for the opening of the house to the public that October. Curator of the exhibition Michael Snodin saw Walpole as an influential figure in both collection and architecture: "He created a form of thematised historical display which prefigured modern museums. And Strawberry Hill was the most influential building of the early Gothic revival".

After a £9 million, two-year-long restoration, Strawberry Hill House reopened to the public on Saturday, 2 October 2010.

In 2013, Strawberry Hill House won the European Union Prize for Cultural Heritage in the Europa Nostra Awards. The Walpole Trust re-opened Strawberry Hill to the public on 1 March 2015.

Lost Treasures of Strawberry Hill exhibition

Between October 2018 and February 2019, the house was repopulated with some 150 artworks from Horace Walpole's collection. Having been dispersed in the great sale of 1842, they were located in museums and private collections around the world, and brought back to their exact locations in Strawberry Hill House, as mapped in Walpole's detailed plans of each room.

The curators suggest that some of the portraits, such as Peter Lely's "sensual" A Boy as a Shepherd, as well as those of Walpole's male friends, imply that he was homosexual.

Other objects suggest a gothic sensibility, such as the clock which Henry VIII gave to his second wife Anne Boleyn, who was later beheaded; the critic Jonathan Jones of The Guardian calls this "truly spooky", like the 500-year-old red cardinal's hat that Walpole believed, most probably correctly, belonged to Cardinal Wolsey. But in Jones's opinion, the "most gothic" painting exhibited was by Walpole's contemporary, William Hogarth: his 1733 portrait of the triple murderer Sarah Malcolm in prison.

Strawberry Hill Gothic

The Strawberry Hill Gothic architectural style became briefly popular, though the researcher Peter Lindfield has argued that the term is not satisfactory for "any Georgian Gothic output" as the houses it has been applied to are varied in style and "have almost nothing in common with the form, appearance, and decoration of Strawberry Hill". Houses built or refronted supposedly in the style include:
 Braziers Park, a South Oxfordshire country house built by Daniel Harris in 1688, re-fronted in the Gothic style in 1799; Lindfield argues that it was influenced more by "very Gothic Oxford" where Harris lived and worked, than by Strawberry Hill House.
 Chalfont Park, Buckinghamshire, rebuilt in 1760 to designs by John Chute.
 Donnington Park, Berkshire, a house designed by John Chute in 1763.
 Houghton Lodge, a fishing lodge in Hampshire, built around 1800 in the Cottage orné style, influenced by Strawberry Hill.
 Lee Priory, Kent, by James Wyatt 1780–1790, destroyed in the 1950s.
 Priory Hospital in Roehampton, which was built in the Strawberry Hill Gothic style in 1811.

References

Sources
Calloway, Stephen, Snodin, Michael, and Wainwright, Clive, Horace Walpole and Strawberry Hill, Orleans House Gallery, Richmond upon Thames, 1980.
Fothergill, Brian. The Strawberry Hill Set: Horace Walpole and His Circle. Faber and Faber. London. 1983.
 Michael Snodin, ed., Horace Walpole’s Strawberry Hill, Yale UP, New Haven and London. 2009.
Walpole, Horace and Amery, Colin. On Modern Gardening. Young Books. New York. 1931.
Warburton, Elliot. Memoirs of Horace Walpole and His Contemporaries. Henry Colburn. London. 1851.

External links

 Strawberry Hill House website
 Friends of Strawberry Hill
 The Strawberry Hill Residents' Association
 Pope's Grotto Preservation Trust
 (London Borough of Richmond-upon-Thames) "Horace Walpole and Strawberry Hill"

18th century in London

Gothic Revival architecture in London
Grade I listed houses in London
Grade II* listed parks and gardens in London
Historic house museums in London
History of Middlesex
Houses completed in 1762
Literary museums in London
Middlesex
Museums in Twickenham
St Mary's University, Twickenham
Twickenham